Tai Hang Tung Estate is a public housing estate in Kowloon Tong, Sham Shui Po District, Kowloon, Hong Kong, located near the Tai Hang Sai and Nam Shan Estates as well as Shek Kip Mei station.

The Tai Hang Tung Estate was a resettlement estate built by the British Hong Kong government in 1955, after a fire broke out the squatter area in Tai Hang Tung in 1952. The estate started redevelopment and rehabilitation in the 1970s. The first batch of redeveloped buildings were constructed in 1983 and 1986 respectively. The last four old blocks, Tung Fu House, Tung Wing House, Tung Wan House and Tung Wo House, were demolished in 2003. Two buildings in Redevelopment Phase 1, Tung Kin House and Tung Yi House, were built in 2002.

Houses

Demographics
According to the 2016 by-census, Tai Hang Tung Estate had a population of 4,562. The median age was 51.2 and the majority of residents (96.8 per cent) were of Chinese ethnicity. The average household size was 2.3 people. The median monthly household income of all households (i.e. including both economically active and inactive households) was HK$19,250.

Politics
Tai Hang Tung Estate is located in Nam Shan, Tai Hang Tung & Tai Hang Sai constituency of the Sham Shui Po District Council. It was formerly represented by Tam Kwok-kiu, who was elected in the 2019 elections until July 2021.

See also
 Public housing in Hong Kong
 Public housing estates in Shek Kip Mei

References

External links

 Image of Tai Hang Tung squatter fire, 22 July 1954

Residential buildings completed in 1955
Residential buildings completed in 1983
Residential buildings completed in 1986
Residential buildings completed in 2002
Kowloon Tong
Public housing estates in Hong Kong
1955 establishments in Hong Kong